Ruler (1777 – 4 February 1806) was a British Thoroughbred racehorse. He won three of his five starts, including the two-mile St. Leger Stakes in 1780. He was bred and owned by William Bethell.

Background
Ruler was a bay colt bred by William Bethell and foaled in 1777. He was sired by Young Marske, who won his only race and later became a successful stallion. Ruler was the second foal of Flora, a daughter of Lofty.

Racing career
Ruler's first race was at Hunmanby on 24 May 1780, when he started as the odds-on favourite for a sweepstakes of 25 guineas each. He won the race, beating Foxhuntoribus, Young Ragman, Young Hyder and one other. On 27 September, he started at the price of 5/2 for the two-mile St. Leger Stakes at Doncaster. He beat Mr. Stapleton's Antagonist (the 4/6 favourite), Lord Scarbrough's brother to Ovid, Lord Rockingham's chestnut colt, Sir John Lister Kaye's Zodiac and Colonel St. Leger's chestnut colt to win the race. His only start in 1781 was at York, where he finished third behind Fortitude and Arske. In May 1781 he beat Laura and Junior to win £50 at Hunmanby. At the York August meeting he faced Thornville, Regent and Laura in a subscription of 25 guineas each run over four miles. He looked likely to win, but dislocated his fetlock and had to be retired from racing.

Stud career
Ruler stood as a stallion for John Pratt until his death in 1785. Ruler then purchased by Mark Bulmer and stood at Middleham in Yorkshire. He stud fee was initially two guineas and two shilling for the groom, but after some early success it was raised to five guineas and five shillings in 1791. In 1796, 1797 and 1798 he commanded a fee of eight and a half guineas, before returning to five guineas and five shillings in 1799. Ruler died on 4 February 1806 at Wyton in the East Riding of Yorkshire, where he had moved to after 1800. He sired a good number of winners, including Governor, High Eagle, Minikin, Mittimus, Pencil, Phalanx, Sober Robin and Weathercock. One of Ruler's unnamed daughters foaled Miss Nancy, who was the dam of The Duchess. The Duchess won the St. Leger in 1816 and Ruler also sired the dam of York Royal Plate winner Sweetwilliam.

Pedigree

Note: b. = Bay, br. = Brown, ch. = Chestnut

* Ruler was inbred 3 × 4 × 4 to Godolphin Arabian. This means that the stallions appear once in the third generation and twice in the fourth generation of his pedigree.

References

1777 racehorse births
1806 racehorse deaths
Racehorses bred in the Kingdom of Great Britain
Racehorses trained in the Kingdom of Great Britain
Thoroughbred family 31
St Leger winners